The 2012 Delray Beach International Tennis Championships was a professional tennis tournament played on hard courts. It was the 20th edition of the tournament which was part of the World Tour 250 series of the 2012 ATP World Tour. It took place in Delray Beach, United States between 27 February and 4 March 2012. Seventh-seeded Kevin Anderson won the singles title.

Singles main-draw entrants

Seeds

 Rankings are as of February 20, 2012

Other entrants
The following players received wildcards into the singles main draw:
  Tommy Haas
  Denis Kudla
  Jesse Levine
 
The following players received entry from the qualifying draw:
  Austin Krajicek
  Marinko Matosevic
  Tim Smyczek
  Michael Yani

Doubles main-draw entrants

Seeds

 Rankings are as of February 20, 2012

Other entrants
The following pairs received wildcards into the doubles main draw:
  Jesse Levine /  Bobby Reynolds
  Nicholas Monroe /  Jack Sock

The following pairs entry as alternates:
  Stefano Ianni /  Denis Kudla
  James Ward /  Michael Yani

Withdrawals
  Alex Bogomolov Jr. (illness)
  Jürgen Melzer (back injury)

Finals

Singles

 Kevin Anderson defeated  Marinko Matosevic, 6–4, 7–6(7–2)
It was Anderson's 1st title of the year and 2nd of his career.

Doubles

 Colin Fleming /  Ross Hutchins defeated  Michal Mertiňák /  André Sá 2–6, 7–6(7–5), [15–13]

References

External links
Official website

 
2012 ATP World Tour
2012 in sports in Florida
2012 in American tennis
February 2012 sports events in the United States
March 2012 sports events in the United States
2012